Faculty of Pharmacy, Uttar Pradesh University of Medical Sciences, formerly Pharmacy College Saifai, is a government pharmacy college in Saifai, Etawah district of Uttar Pradesh, established in 2015. It is first grant-in-aid college run by Uttar Pradesh Government offering degree course in Pharmacy. For the first batch enrolled in year of 2015–16, it was affiliated with Dr. A.P.J. Abdul Kalam Technical University, and from 2016–17, it became a constituent college of the newly established Uttar Pradesh University of Medical Sciences. It gives admission from university's own entrance exam, named CPPNET.

References

External links 
 

Pharmacy colleges in Uttar Pradesh
Pharmacy education in India
Pharmacy schools in India
Universities and colleges in Saifai
Educational institutions established in 2015
2015 establishments in Uttar Pradesh
Uttar Pradesh University of Medical Sciences
Saifai